Kotezi can refer to:

 Kotezi (Bugojno), a village in municipality of Bugojno, Bosnia and Herzegovina
 Kotezi (Trebinje), a village in municipality of Trebinje, Bosnia and Herzegovina
 Kotezi, Croatia, a village near Vrgorac, Croatia
 Kotezi Viaduct, a viaduct on the A1 motorway near Vrgorac